José Róbson do Nascimento, better known as Róbson or Robgol (born May 10, 1970 in Barra de São Miguel, Paraíba state is a Brazilian politician and former association football forward.

Career
Róbson's football career started in 1987, playing for Náutico, of Pernambuco state. His nickname, Robgol, is a truncation of his name Róbson and the word  (Portuguese for goal). In 2005 Róbson became the second goalscorer in Campeonato Brasileiro Série A with 21 goals.

Achievements and titles
During his career, José Róbson do Nascimento has won several titles:
1995: Campeonato Maranhense top goalscorer, with 19 goals (Maranhão)
1996: Campeonato Pernambucano top goalscorer, with 19 goals (Náutico)
1999: Campeonato Potiguar (ABC)
2001: Campeonato Baiano (Bahia)
2001: Campeonato do Nordeste (Bahia)
2002: Campeonato do Nordeste (Bahia)
2003: Campeonato Paraense top goalscorer, with 9 goals (Paysandu)
2005: Campeonato Paraense (Paysandu)

Politics
On June 21, 2006, Robgol retired from football, and joined the Partido Trabalhista Brasileiro (Brazilian Labour Party). During the 2006 general elections, he was elected Pará state deputy, with 33,400 votes, being the 35th most voted deputy candidate of his state.

Club statistics

References

External links

Stats at 大分トリニータ

Living people
1970 births
Brazilian footballers
Brazilian expatriate footballers
América Futebol Clube (MG) players
Botafogo de Futebol e Regatas players
Esporte Clube Bahia players
Sport Club Internacional players
Santos FC players
Esporte Clube Juventude players
Mirassol Futebol Clube players
Santa Cruz Futebol Clube players
Sport Club do Recife players
Paysandu Sport Club players
Oita Trinita players
Campeonato Brasileiro Série A players
J1 League players
Expatriate footballers in Japan
Brazilian Labour Party (current) politicians
People from Pará
Brazilian sportsperson-politicians
Association football forwards
Sportspeople from Pará